Iceland's first ambassador to France was Pétur Benediktsson in 1946. Since 2016, the ambassador has been Kristján Andri Stefánsson.

List of ambassadors

See also
France–Iceland relations
Foreign relations of Iceland
Ambassadors of Iceland

References
List of Icelandic representatives (Icelandic Foreign Ministry website) 

1946 establishments
Main
France
Iceland